The Quality Assurance Journal was a quarterly peer-reviewed healthcare journal published by John Wiley & Sons. It covered quality assurance issues relating to the healthcare and environmental industries. It was established in 1997 and ceased publication at the end of 2011. The founding editor-in-chief was David Long and the last editors were Rita Hattemer-Apostel and Anthony B. Jones.

Abstracting and indexing 
The journal is abstracted and indexed in ProQuest databases, EMBASE, EMBASE, and Scopus.

External links 
 

Public health journals
Publications established in 1997
English-language journals
Publications disestablished in 2011
Defunct journals of the United States
Quarterly journals
Wiley (publisher) academic journals